Matarawa railway station is a small single-platform railway station on the Wairarapa Line that serves the small rural community of Matarawa in the Wairarapa district of New Zealand.

History 

This station opened on 1 November 1880, when the line between Woodside Junction and Masterton was officially opened.  Initially it had a shelter shed, loading bank and crossing loop and was used to cross trains until the introduction of signalling at the larger Wairarapa stations.  In its early years several sawmills flourished in the vicinity, with timber making up a bulk of the goods loaded.  The crossing loop and private sawmill sidings have been removed.

In 2006, with the introduction of the SW-class carriages for the Wairarapa Connection service looming, it was proposed that this station be closed due to its low patronage and the cost involved in building a platform so that passengers could safely board and disembark from the new carriages.  After vocal opposition from local residents, this proposal was rescinded.

This station was temporarily closed from 17 May 2007 to 4 June 2007 to enable construction work to proceed on preparations for the new carriages.  The station was reopened on 7 June 2007 with a new platform (prior to the upgrade it did not have a platform).

Services 
The request stop is served by the Wairarapa Connection has five services each way on Monday to Thursday, six on Friday and two on Saturday and Sunday. Trains run to Masterton and Wellington.
No bus routes serve the station.

References

External links
 Passenger service timetables from Tranz Metro and Metlink.
 
 
 
 

Rail transport in Wellington
Public transport in the Wellington Region
Buildings and structures in the Wairarapa
Railway stations in New Zealand
Railway stations opened in 1880
Carterton District